Daejeon Health Sciences College is a technical college providing training in the health sciences in South Korea.  It is located in the Dong-gu district of  Daejeon metropolitan city.  The college carries a maximum enrollment of about 3,700.  The current president is Lee Gang-o (이강오).

History
The school began as Daejeon Technical School of Health (대전보건전문학교) in 1978, and gained technical-college status later the same year.  Its present name was adopted in 1998.

Sister schools
The college's sister schools include New South Wales University's optics department, and South Baylor University.

See also
List of colleges and universities in South Korea
Education in South Korea

External links
Official school website, in English

Universities and colleges in Daejeon
Educational institutions established in 1978
Dong District, Daejeon
1978 establishments in South Korea